Dibratrir Kabya is a 1970 Bengali black-and-white film starring Madhabi Mukherjee, Anjana Bhowmik and Basant Choudhury in the lead roles. The film was directed by Bimal Bhowmik and Narayan Chakraborty. The film won two National Film Awards at the 17th National Film Awards. It was based on the novel of the same name by Manik Bandyopadhyay.

Cast
 Madhabi Mukherjee
 Anjana Bhowmik
 Basant Choudhury
 Anubha Gupta
 Kanu Bannerjee

Music
"Bhora Thaak Milone Utsober Gaan" - Sumitra Sen (composer: Rabindranath Tagore)

Awards
 National Film Award for Second Best Feature Film.
 National Film Award for Best Actress – Madhabi Mukherjee

References

Bengali-language Indian films
Films featuring a Best Actress National Award-winning performance
Second Best Feature Film National Film Award winners
1970s Bengali-language films
Films scored by Timir Baran
Films scored by Rabindranath Tagore